"Fireworks" or in album version Light It Up is a song by American rapper Snoop Dogg, released to promote his fourteenth studio album Coolaid, with the record labels; Doggystyle Records and eOne Music. The song, produced by Swizz Beatz.

Release and promotion 
On June 2, 2016, Snoop Dogg announced that the album is titled "Coolaid" and performed songs "Fireworks" and "Legend" on Jimmy Kimmel Live!.

Live performances 
The song was the performed for the public for the first time on June 2, 2016 in Jimmy Kimmel Live!.

References

2016 songs
Snoop Dogg songs
Songs written by Snoop Dogg
Song recordings produced by Swizz Beatz